Ristola is a surname. Notable people with the surname include:

Aleksi Ristola (born 1989), Finnish footballer
Pekka Ristola (born 1929), Finnish Nordic combined skier

See also
Ristolas, former French commune

Finnish-language surnames